The following is a list of rock instrumentals. Only instrumentals that are notable  are included.

Instrumentals which have charted
Instrumental rock is rock music that emphasizes musical instruments and features very little or no singing. An instrumental is a musical composition or recording without lyrics, or singing, although it might include some inarticulate vocals, such as shouted backup vocals in a big band setting.

1950s and 1960s chartings

1970s and 1980s chartings

0-9

10cc
 "How Dare You" (How Dare You! (album), 1976)

A

A Flock of Seagulls
 "DNA" (A Flock of Seagulls, 1982)

ABBA
 "Intermezzo No. 1" (ABBA, 1975)
 "Arrival" (Arrival, 1976)

AC/DC
 "Fling Thing" (B-side of "Jailbreak", 1976)
 "D.T." ("From album: Who Made Who", 1985)
 "Chase the Ace" ("From album: Who Made Who", 1985)

Aerosmith
 "The Movie" ("From album: Permanent Vacation", 1987)
 "Krawhitham" (Pandora's Box, 1991)
 "Circle Jerk" (Pandora's Box, 1991)
 "Boogie Man" ("From album: Get A Grip", 1993)

The Alan Parsons Project
 "Dream Within a Dream" (Tales of Mystery and Imagination, 1976)
 "The Fall of the Usher House" (Tales of Mystery and Imagination, 1976)
 "I Robot" (I Robot, 1977)
 "Nucleus" (I Robot, 1977)
 "Total Eclipse" (I Robot, 1977)
 "Genesis Ch.1 V32" (I Robot, 1977)
 "Voyager" (Pyramid, 1978)
 "In the Lap of the Gods" (Pyramid, 1978)
 "Hyper Gamma Spaces" (Pyramid, 1978)
 "Lucifer" (Eve, 1979)
 "Secret Garden" (Eve, 1979)
 "The Gold Bug" (The Turn of a Friendly Card, 1980)
 "The Ace of Swords" (The Turn of a Friendly Card, 1980)
 "Sirius" (Eye in the Sky, 1982)
 "Mammagamma" (Eye in the Sky, 1982)
 "Pipeline" (Ammonia Avenue, 1984)
 "Hawkeye" (Vulture Culture, 1985)
 "Beaujolais" (Stereotomy, 1986)
 "Where's the Walrus?" (Stereotomy, 1986)
 "Chinese Whispers" (Stereotomy, 1986)
 "Paseo De Gracia" (Gaudi, 1987)

The Allman Brothers Band

 "In Memory of Elizabeth Reed" (Idlewild South, 1970)
 "Hot 'Lanta" (At Fillmore East, 1971)
 "Mountain Jam" (Eat a Peach)
 "Little Martha" (Eat a Peach)
 "Jessica" (Brothers and Sisters, 1973)
 "Pegasus" (Enlightened Rogues, 1979)

An Endless Sporadic
 "Ameliorate" (EP, 2008)
 "An Endless Sporadic" (Album, 2009)
 "Spaceship Factory" (Single, 2014)
 "Derpulous" (Single, 2014)
 "The Adventures of Jabubu II" (Single, 2015)
 "Magic Machine" (Album, 2016)

And So I Watch You from Afar
 And So I Watch You from Afar (2009)

Animals as Leaders
 "Animals as Leaders" (2009)
 "Wave of Babies" (Single) (2010)
 "Weightless" (2011)
 "The Joy of Motion" (2014)
 "The Madness of Many" (2016)

Anthrax
 "Pipeline" (Attack of the Killer B's, 1991)

Apocalyptica
 Plays Metallica by Four Cellos (1996)
 Inquisition Symphony (1998)
 Cult (2000) The Standard Version it's all instrumental and the Special Edition Disk 2 include: "Path Vol. 2" feat. Sandra Nasić and "Hope Vol. 2" feat. Matthias Sayer on vocals.
 Reflections (2003) On The Revised, Russian Edition & 2005 US Reissue it's include: "Seemann (Rammstein Cover)" feat. Nina Hagen on vocals.
 Apocalyptica (2005) Vocals:  "Life Burns!" & "Bittersweet" feat. Lauri Ylönen; "En Vie" feat. Manu; On Special Edition Bonus Tracks: "How Far" & "Wie Weit" Marta Jandová.
 Amplified // A Decade of Reinventing the Cello It consists the band's most notable covers and original songs on 2 CDs, one for the instrumentals tunes and the other for the tunes with vocals.
 Worlds Collide (2003) Vocals: "I Don't Care" Adam Gontier of Three Days Grace; "I'm Not Jesus" Corey Taylor of Slipknot, Stone Sour; "S.O.S (Anything but Love)" Cristina Scabbia of Lacuna Coil, additionals backing vocals: Mats Levén of Therion, Krux; "Helden" Till Lindemann of Rammstein.
 7th Symphony (2003) Vocals: "End of Me" Gavin Rossdale of Bush; "Not Strong Enough (Album Version)" Brent Smith of Shinedown; "Not Strong Enough (US Single Version)" Doug Robb of Hoobastank; "Broken Pieces" Lacey Mosley of Flyleaf; "Bring Them to Light" Joe Duplantier of Gojira.
 Wagner Reloaded-Live in Leipzig (2013)

Asia
 Rare (2000)

August Burns Red
 "Carol of the Bells" (online single, 2007)
 "O Come O Come, Emmanuel" (O Come, O Come, Emmanuel 7", 2009)
 "The Little Drummer Boy" (God Rest Ye Merry Gentlemen 7", 2011)

Avenged Sevenfold
 "Jade Helm" (Black Reign EP, 2018)

Average White Band
 "Pick Up the Pieces", (1974), No. 1 US, No. 6 UK

B

The Bar-Kays
 "Soul Finger", (1967), No. 17 US, No. 33 UK, No. 3 R&B

The Beach Boys

 "Misirlou" (Surfin' U.S.A., 1963)
 "Let's Go Trippin'" (Surfin' U.S.A.)
 "Summer Means New Love" (Summer Days, 1965)
 "Let's Go Away for Awhile" (Pet Sounds, 1966)
 "Pet Sounds" (Pet Sounds)
 "Look" (recorded at sessions for Smiley Smile, later released with vocals)
 "I Wanna Be Around" / "Workshop" (The Smile Sessions, 2011)
 "The Elements: Fire" (The Smile Sessions)

Beastie Boys
 Sabrosa (1994)
 The in Sound from Way Out! (1996)
 The Mix-Up (2007)
 Multilateral Nuclear Disarmament (2011)

The Beatles
 "Cry for a Shadow" (1964)
 "Flying" (Magical Mystery Tour, 1967)
 "Cayenne" (Anthology 1, 1995)
 "12-Bar Original" (Anthology 2, 1996)

Bee Gees
 "Seven Seas Symphony" (Odessa, 1969)

Bill Black's Combo
Most, if not all, of the Bill Black Combo's recordings are instrumentals.
 "White Silver Sands", (1960), No. 9 US, No. 33 UK, No. 1 R&B
 "Don't Be Cruel", (1960), No. 11 US, No. 32 UK, No. 1 R&B

Bill Doggett
 "Honky Tonk (Parts 1 & 2)" (1956) No. 2 US No. 1 R&B
 "Slow Walk" (1956)  No. 26 US No. 4 R&B
 "Soft" (1957) No. 35 US

Bill Justis
 "Raunchy" (1957), No. 2 US, No. 24 UK,  No. 1 R&B

Billy Joel
 "Nocturne" (Cold Spring Harbor, 1971)
 "Root Beer Rag" (Streetlife Serenade, 1974)
 "The Mexican Connection" (Streetlife Serenade, 1974)
 "Prelude" (Turnstiles, 1976)

Billy Preston
 "Outa-Space", (1971), No. 2 US, No. 1 UK, No. 44 R&B
 "Space Race", (1973), No. 4 US, No. 1 R&B

Black Flag
 The Process of Weeding Out EP (1985)

Black Sabbath

 "Rat Salad" (Paranoid, 1971)
 "Embryo" (Master of Reality, 1971)
 "Orchid" (Master of Reality, 1971)
 "FX" (Vol. 4, 1972)
 "Laguna Sunrise" (Vol. 4, 1972)
 "Fluff" (Sabbath Bloody Sabbath, 1973)
 "Don't Start (Too Late)" (Sabotage, 1975)
 "Supertzar" (Sabotage, 1975)
 "Breakout" (Never Say Die!, 1978)
 "E5150" (Mob Rules, 1981)
 "Stonehenge" (Born Again, 1983)
 "The Dark" (Born Again, 1983)
 "Sphinx (The Guardian)" (Seventh Star, 1986)
 "Scarlet Pimpernel" (The Eternal Idol, 1987)
 "The Gates Of Hell" (Headless Cross, 1989)
 "The Battle Of Tyr" (Tyr, 1990)

Blaqk Audio
 "Stiff Kittens" (CexCells, 2007)

The Bobby Fuller Four
 "Misirlou", 1964

Booker T. and the M.G.'s
Most, if not all, of the band's recordings are instrumentals.

Boston
 "Foreplay" (Boston, 1976)
 "A New World" (Third Stage", 1986)
 "Walkin' at Night" (Walk On", 1994)
 "Get Organ-ized"/"Get Reorgan-ized" (Walk On", 1994)
 "The Star-Spangled Banner/4th of July Reprise" (Greatest Hits", 1997)
 "Last Day of School" (Life, Love & Hope", 2013)

B. T. Express
 "Express", (1974), No. 2 US,#34 UK, No. 1 R&B,

Bradley Joseph
 Hear the Masses (1994)

Brian May
 Furia (2000) except "Dream of Thee".

Brian Wilson
 "The Elements: Fire" (SMiLE, 2004)

Bruce Cockburn
 "Nude Descending a Staircase" (Life Short Call Now)

B. Bumble and the Stingers
 "Bumble Boogie", (1961), No. 21 US, based on Rimsky-Korsakov's "Flight of the Bumble Bee"
 "Nut Rocker" (1962), The recording is a version of the march from Tchaikovsky's ballet The Nutcracker.

Buckethead

Most, if not all, of Buckethead's recordings are instrumentals.
 "Sketches of Spain (For Miles)" (Electric Tears, 2002)
 "Spokes for the Wheel of Torment" (The Cuckoo Clocks of Hell, 2004)
 "Jordan" (Guitar Hero II, 2006)

The Byrds
 "John Riley" & "Captain Soul", (Fifth Dimension, 1966)

C

Café Tacuba
 "Perfidia" (Avalancha de Éxitos, 1996)
 Revés (1999)

Cake
 "Arco Arena" (Comfort Eagle, 2001)

Calexico
 Tool Box (2007)

Camel

 Supertwister (Mirage, 1974)
 Earthrise (Mirage)
 The Snow Goose (1975)
 Aristillus (Moonmadness, 1976)
 Chord Change (Moonmadness)
 Lunar Sea (Moonmadness)
 First Light (Rain Dances, 1977)
 One of These Days I'll Get an Early Night (Rain Dances)
 Elke (Rain Dances)
 Skylines (Rain Dances)
 Rain Dances (Rain Dances)
 The Sleeper (Breathless, 1978)
 Eye of the Storm (I Can See Your House from Here, 1979)
 Survival (I Can See Your House from Here)
 Ice (I Can See Your House from Here)
 Pressure Points (Stationary Traveller, 1984)
 Missing(Stationary Traveller)
 After Words(Stationary Traveller)
 Dust Bowl (Dust and Dreams, 1991)
 Dusted Out (Dust and Dreams)
 Needles (Dust and Dreams)
 Milk and Honey (Dust and Dreams)
 Storm Clouds (Dust and Dreams)
 Cotton Camp (Dust and Dreams)
 Broken Banks (Dust and Dreams)
 Sheet Rain (Dust and Dreams)
 Whispers (Dust and Dreams)
 Little Rivers and Little Rose (Dust and Dreams)
 Hopeless Anger (Dust and Dreams)
 Whispers in the Rain (Dust and Dreams)
 Irish Air (Instrumental Reprise) (Harbour of Tears, 1996)
 Cóbh (Harbour of Tears)
 Under the Moon (Harbour of Tears)
 Generations (Harbour of Tears)
 Running from Paradise (Harbour of Tears)
 Coming of Age (Harbour of Tears)
 The Hour Candle (A Song for my Father) (Harbour of Tears)
 Three Wishes (Rajaz, 1999)
 Sahara (Rajaz)

Camper Van Beethoven
 "Interstellar Overdrive" (Camper Van Beethoven, 1986)

Carlos Santana
 Blues for Salvador (1987)

The Champs
Most, if not all, of the Champs recordings are instrumentals.
 "Tequila" (1959), No. 1 US, No. 5 UK, No. 1 R&B
 "Limbo Rock" (1962), No. 40 US featured Earl Palmer on drums, Tommy Tedesco on guitar, and Plas Johnson on sax

The Chantays
 "Pipeline" (Pipeline, 1963)

The Chemical Brothers
 "Song to the Siren" (Exit Planet Dust, 1992)

Chicago
 "Ballet for a Girl in Buchannon: Anxiety's Moment" (Chicago, 1970)
 "Ballet for a Girl in Buchannon: West Virginia Fantasies" (Chicago)
 "Ballet for a Girl in Buchannon: To Be Free" (Chicago)

Chris Poland
 Return to Metalopolis (1990)

Cliff Nobles and Co.
 "The Horse", (1968), No. 2 US, No. 2 UK, No. 2 R&B

The Commodores
 "Machine Gun", (1974), No. 22 US, No. 20 UK, No. 7 R&B

Cream
 "Toad" (Fresh Cream, 1966)
 "Steppin' Out" (Live Cream Volume II, 1972)

Creedence Clearwater Revival
 "Susie Q. (Part 2)" (B-side of single, 1968, excerpted from longer album track which contained vocals)

D

Dave "Baby" Cortez
 "The Happy Organ" (1959), No. 1 US, No. 5 R&B

Dave Clark Five
 Instrumental Album (1966)

David Bowie

 "Speed of Life" (Low, 1977)
 "A New Career in a New Town" (Low)
 "Warszawa" (Low)
 "Art Decade" (Low)
 "Weeping Wall" (Low)
 "V-2 Schneider" ("Heroes", 1977)
 "Sense of Doubt" ("Heroes")
 "Moss Garden" ("Heroes")
 "Neuköln" ("Heroes")
 "Crystal Japan" (Japanese single, 1980)
 "The Wedding" (Black Tie White Noise, 1993)

David Gilmour 
 "Raise My Rent" (David Gilmour, 1978)
 "Let's Get Metaphysical" (About Face, 1984)
 "Castellorizon" (On an Island, 2006)
 "Red Sky at Night" (On an Island, 2006)
 "Then I Close My Eyes" (On an Island, 2006)
 "5 A.M." (Rattle That Lock, 2015)
 "Beauty" (Rattle That Lock, 2015)
 "And Then..." (Rattle That Lock, 2015)

The Dakotas
 "The Cruel Sea", (1963), No. 18 UK

Dave Matthews Band
 "#34" (Under the Table and Dreaming, 1994)
 "Anyone Seen the Bridge?" (live-only)

Deep Purple

 "And The Address" (Shades Of Deep Purple, 1968)
 "Wring That Neck" (Book Of Taliesyn, 1968)
 "Fault Line" (Deep Purple, 1969)
 "'A' 200" (Burn, 1974)
 "Coronarias Redig" ("Might Just Take Your Life" single B-side, 1974)
 "Owed To 'G'" (Come Taste The Band, 1975)
 "Son Of Alerik" ("Perfect Strangers" single B-side, 1985)

Dennis Coffey
 "Scorpio", (1971), No. 6 US, No. 7 UK, No. 9 R&B

Deodato
 "Also Sprach Zarathustra (2001)", (1973), No. 2 US, No. 7 UK, based on Richard Strauss's Also sprach Zarathustra

Derek and the Dominos
 "Tell the Truth (Jam No. 1)" (The Layla Sessions)

The Derek Trucks Band
Most of the band's early recordings, prior to their introduction of vocalist Mike Mattison, are instrumentals.  Many of these recordings also veer strongly towards jazz fusion with rock elements.

Derek Sherinian
 Planet X (1999)
 Inertia (2001)
 Black Utopia (2003)
 Mythology (2004)
 Blood of the Snake (2006)
 Molecular Heinosity (2009)
 The Phoenix (2020)

Destroyalldreamers
Most, if not all, of the band's recordings are instrumentals.

Dick Dale
Most of Dale's recordings are instrumentals.
 "Let's Go Trippin'" (1961)
 "Misirlou" (1962)

Dixie Dregs
Most, if not all, of the band's recordings are instrumentals.

Down
 "Pray for the Locust" (NOLA, 1995)
 "Doobinterlude" (Down II: A Bustle in Your Hedgerow, 2002)
 "Flambeaux's Jamming with St. Aug" (Down II: A Bustle in Your Hedgerow, 2002)

Dream Theater

 "Another Hand" (Live at the Marquee)
 "Bombay Vindaloo" (Live at the Marquee)
 "A Mind Beside Itself I: Erotomania" (Awake, 1994)
 "Eve" (The Silent Man single, 1994)
 "A Change of Seasons I: The Crimson Sunrise" (A Change of Seasons, 1995)
 "A Change of Seasons IV: The Darkest of Winters" (A Change of Seasons, 1995)
 "A Change of Seasons VI: The Inevitable Summer" (A Change of Seasons, 1995)
 "Cruise Control" (A Change of Seasons, 1995)
 "Funeral For a Friend" (A Change of Seasons, 1995)
 "The Rover" (A Change of Seasons, 1995)
 "Hell's Kitchen" (Falling Into Infinity, 1997)
 "Trial of Tears II: Deep In Heaven" (Falling Into Infinity, 1997)
 "Puppies on Acid" (Once in a LIVEtime, 1998)
 "Scene Two: Overture 1928" (Metropolis, Pt. 2: Scenes From A Memory, 1999)
 "Scene Seven: The Dance Of Eternety" (Metropolis, Pt. 2: Scenes From A Memory, 1999)
 "Acid Rain" (Live Scenes From New York, 2001)
 "Six Degrees of Inner Turbulence: I. Overture" (Six Degrees of Inner Turbulence, 2002)
 "Stream of Consciousness" (Train of Thought, 2003)
 "Instrumedley" (Live at Budokan, 2004)
 "In the Presence of Enemies I: Prelude" (Systematic Chaos, 2007)
 "In the Presence of Enemies V: The Reckoning" (Systematic Chaos, 2007)
 "Larks' Tongues in Aspic - Part II" (Special Edition of Black Clouds & Silver Linings, 2009)
 "Odyssey" (Special Edition of Black Clouds & Silver Linings, 2009)
 "Raw Dog" (God of War III Soundtrack, 2010)
 "False Awakening Suite" (Dream Theater, 2013)
 "Enigma Machine" (Dream Theater, 2013)
 "Illumination Theory I: Paradoxe de la Lumière Noire" (Dream Theater, 2013)
 "Illumination Theory III: The Embracing Circle" (Dream Theater, 2013)
 "Dystopian Overture" (The Astonishing, 2016)
 "2285 Entr'acte" (The Astonishing, 2016)

Duane Eddy
Most, if not all, of the Duane Eddy's recordings are instrumentals.
 "Rebel Rouser" (1958), No. 6 US, No. 8 UK, No. 19 R&B, saxophone by session musician Gil Bernal, yells and handclaps by doo-wop group the Rivingtons.
 "Peter Gunn" (1959), No. 8 US,  No. 6 UK,  this was the second charting of the song in 1959

The Durutti Column
Most of the band's recordings are instrumentals.

E

Earthless
Most, if not all, of the band's recordings are instrumentals.

The Edgar Winter Group
 "Frankenstein" (They Only Come Out at Night, 1972)

Electric Light Orchestra
 "Daybreaker" (On the Third Day, 1973)
 "In the Hall of the Mountain King" (On the Third Day)
 "Fire on High" (Face the Music, 1975)
 "The Whale" (Out of the Blue, 1977)

Elton John
 "Funeral for a Friend" (Goodbye Yellow Brick Road, 1973)

Emerson, Lake and Palmer
 "The Barbarian" (Emerson, Lake & Palmer, 1970)
 "Tank" (Emerson, Lake & Palmer)
 "Nut Rocker" (Pictures at an Exhibition)
 "Hoedown" (Trilogy, 1972)
 "Karn Evil 9: Second Impression" (Brain Salad Surgery, 1973)
 "Fanfare for the Common Man" (Works Volume 1, 1977)
 "Canario" (Love Beach, 1978)

Eric Clapton
 "Edge of Darkness" (24 Nights, 1991)

Eric Clapton and the Powerhouse
 Steppin' Out, ("What's Shakin'", 1966), Eric Clapton guitar, Paul Jones harmonica, Jack Bruce bass, Steve Winwood vocals and Pete York drums.

Eric Johnson
 "Tones" (1986)
 "Ah Via Musicom" (1990)
 "Venus Isle" (1996)
 "Seven Worlds" (1998)
 "Souvenir" (2002)
 "Bloom" (2005)
 "Up Close" (2010)
 "Mrs. Robinson" (EJ, 2016)
 "Once Upon A Time In Texas" (EJ, 2016)
 "Serinidad" (EJ, 2016)
 "Fatherly Downs" (EJ, 2016)
 "The World is Waiting For The Sunrise" (EJ, 2016)
 "Song For Irene" (EJ, 2016)
 "Collage", 2017)
 "Charldron's Boat" (EJ Vol II, 2020)
 "Lake Travis" (EJ Vol II, 2020)
 "Black Waterside" (EJ Vol II, 2020)
 "For The Stars" (EJ Vol II, 2020)

Explosions in the Sky
Most, if not all, of the band's recordings are instrumentals.

F

The Fabulous Thunderbirds
 "Cherry Pink and Apple Blossom White" (Butt Rockin', 1981)

Fleetwood Mac
 "Albatross"/"Jigsaw Puzzle Blues" (1969, included on UK release The Pious Bird of Good Omen/US release English Rose)
 "Oh Well Part 2" (B-side of single, 1969, included on US reissue of Then Play On)

Floyd Cramer
Most, if not all, of the Floyd Cramer's recordings are instrumentals.
 "Last Date", (1960), No. 2 US, No. 32 UK

Focus
 "Hocus Pocus" (Focus II, 1971)

Frank Zappa

A significant portion of Zappa's discography consists of instrumental works, but many of these could be classified as modern classical or avant-garde music rather than rock.
 "Peaches en Regalia" (Hot Rats, 1969)
 "Eat That Question" (The Grand Wazoo)
 Sleep Dirt (1979 - reissues of this album featured overdubbed vocals on several tracks)
 "Rat Tomago" (Sheik Yerbouti, 1979)
 Shut Up 'n Play Yer Guitar/Shut Up 'n Play Yer Guitar Some More/Return of the Son of Shut Up 'n Play Yer Guitar (1981)
 Jazz from Hell (1986)
 The Guitar World According to Frank Zappa (1987)
 Guitar (1988)
 Frank Zappa Plays the Music of Frank Zappa: A Memorial Tribute (1996)
 Trance-Fusion (2006)

FromUz
 "13th August" (Overlook, 2008)

Funkadelic
 "Maggot Brain" (Maggot Brain, 1971)

G

Gary Hoey
Most of Hoey's recordings are instrumentals.

Gary Glitter
 "Rock and Roll Part 2" (Glitter, 1972)

George Harrison
 Wonderwall Music (1968)
 Electronic Sound (1969)
 "Thanks for the Pepperoni" (All Things Must Pass, 1970)
 "I Remember Jeep" (All Things Must Pass, 1970)
 "Out of the Blue" (All Things Must Pass, 1970)
 "Plug Me In" (All Things Must Pass, 1970)
 "Hari's on Tour (Express)" (Dark Horse, 1974)
 "A Bit More of You" (Extra Texture, 1975)

Godspeed You! Black Emperor
Most, if not all, of the band's recordings are instrumentals.

God Is an Astronaut
 The End of the Beginning (2002)
 All Is Violent, All Is Bright (2005)
 Far from Refuge (2007)
 God Is an Astronaut (2008)
 Age of the Fifth Sun (2010)

Godsmack
 "Vampires" (Awake, 2000)
 "The Oracle" (The Oracle, 2010)

Gorillaz
 "Lake Zurich" ("From album: The Now Now", 2018)

Gov't Mule

 Sco-Mule (2015)

Grails
Most, if not all, of the band's recordings are instrumentals.

Gustavo Cerati
 +Bien (2001)

H

Hank Marvin

 Guitar Man (2007)

Hammock
Most, if not all, of the band's recordings are instrumentals.

Harold Faltermeyer and Steve Stevens
 "Top Gun Anthem" (soundtrack to Top Gun, 1986)

Herb Alpert
 "Rise", (1979), No. 1 US, No. 13 UK, No. 4 R&B

Hellecasters
 "Sweet Dreams" (The Return of the Hellecasters, 1993)

Hot Butter
 "Popcorn", (1972), No. 9 US, No. 5 UK

Hugh Masekela
 "Grazing in the Grass", (1968), No. 1 US, No. 1 R&B

I

If These Trees Could Talk
Most, if not all, of the band's recordings are instrumentals.

Iron Maiden
 "Transylvania"
 "The Ides of March"
 "Genghis Khan"
 "Losfer Words"

J

Jack Nietzsche
 "The Lonely Surfer", (1963), No. 39 US

Jade Warrior
 Floating World (1974) (except "Monkey Chant", track 8)
 Waves (1975)
 Kites (1976)

Jan Hammer
 "Miami Vice Theme" (soundtrack to Miami Vice, 1985)
 "Crockett's Theme" (Miami Vice: The Complete Collection, 2002)

Jason Becker
 Perpetual Burn (1988)
 Perspective (1995)
 The Raspberry Jams (1999)
 The Blackberry Jams (2003)

Jazz Is Dead
Most, if not all, of the band's recordings are instrumentals.

Jeff Beck
Most of Beck's recordings following the dissolution of The Jeff Beck Group are instrumentals.
 "Beck's Bolero" (B-side of "Hi Ho Silver Lining", 1967), featuring Jimmy Page, Keith Moon, John Paul Jones, and Nicky Hopkins
 Blow by Blow (1975)
 Wired (1976)
 There & Back (1980)
 Escape Flash, (1985)
 Jeff Beck's Guitar Shop (1989)
 Frankie's House (1992)
 Who Else! (1999)
 You Had It Coming (2001)
 Jeff (2003)
 Emotion & Commotion (2010)
 Loud Hailer (2016)

The Jeff Healey Band
 "Hide Away" (See the Light, 1988)
 "Shapes of Things" (Cover to Cover, 1995)

Jefferson Airplane
 "Embryonic Journey" (Surrealistic Pillow, 1967)

Jet Harris
 "Besame Mucho", (1962), No. 22 UK

Jet Harris and Tony Meehan

 "Diamonds" (1963)
 "Scarlett O'Hara" (1963)

Jimi Hendrix

 "Third Stone from the Sun" (Are You Experienced, 1967)
 "Star Spangled Banner" (Woodstock: Music from the Original Soundtrack and More, 1970)
 "Pali Gap" (Rainbow Bridge, 1971)
 "Born Under a Bad Sign" (Blues, 1994)
 "Sunshine of Your Love" (Valleys of Neptune)

Jimmy Page
 "Outrider" (1988)

Joe Perry
 "Mercy" (Joe Perry, 2005)
 "Twilight" (Joe Perry, 2005)
 "Wooden Ships" (Have Guitar, Will Travel, 2009)
 "Rumble in the Jungle" (Sweetzerland Manifesto, 2018)
 "Spanish Sushi" (Sweetzerland Manifesto, 2018)

The Joe Perry Project
 "Break Song" (Let the Music Do the Talking, 1980)

Joe Satriani

Albums:
 Not of This Earth (1986)
 Surfing with the Alien (1987)
 Dreaming No. 11 (1988)
 Flying in a Blue Dream (1989)
 The Extremist (1992)
 Time Machine (1993)
 Joe Satriani (1995)
 Crystal Planet (1998)
 Engines of Creation (2000)
 Strange Beautiful Music (2002)
 Is There Love in Space? (2004)
 Super Colossal (2006)
 Professor Satchafunkilus and the Musterion of Rock (2008)
 Black Swans and Wormhole Wizards (2010)
 Unstoppable Momentum (2013)
 Shockwave Supernova (2015)
 What Happens Next (2018)
 Shapeshifting (2020)
 When Trees Walked The Earth (Song) (2020)

Johnny and the Hurricanes
Most, if not all, of the band's recordings are instrumentals.
 "Red River Rock" (1959), No. 5 US, No. 3 UK,  No. 5 R&B

John Mayall (& the Bluesbreakers)
 "Hideaway" (Blues Breakers with Eric Clapton, 1966)
 "Steppin' Out" (Blues Breakers with Eric Clapton)

John Petrucci
 An Evening with John Petrucci and Jordan Rudess (2004)
 Suspended Animation (2005)
 Terminal Velocity (2020)

Jordan Rudess
 Arrival (1988)
 Listen (1993)
 Secrets of the Muse (1997)
 Resonance (1999)
 An Evening with John Petrucci and Jordan Rudess (2004)
 Feeding the Wheel (2001)
 4NYC (2002)
 Christmas Sky (2002)
 Rhythm of Time (2004)
 The Road Home (2007)
 Notes on a Dream (2009)
 All That Is Now (2013)
 Explorations (2014)
 The Unforgotten Path (2015)
 Wired for Madness (2019)
 Heartfelt (2019)
 A Chapter In Time (2021)
 Rockestra (2021)

Journey
 Kohoutek (Journey, 1975)
 Topaz (Journey, 1975)
 Nickel and Dime (Next, 1977)
 Majestic (Evolution, 1979)
 The Journey (Revelation) (Revelation, 2008)
 Venus (Eclipse, 2011)

K

Kiko Loureiro
 "No Gravity" (2005)
 "Universo Inverso" (2006)
 "Fullblast" (2009)
 "Sounds of Innocence" (2012)
 "Open Source" (2020)

Kinks
 "Revenge", from the (Kinks album, 1964)

King Crimson
 "Larks' Tongues in Aspic":
 Part I (Larks' Tongues in Aspic, 1973)
 Part II (Larks' Tongues in Aspic)
 Part III (Three of a Perfect Pair, 1984)
 Part IV (the construKction of light, 2000)
 "Providence" (Red)
 "Asbury Park" (USA, 1975)
 "The Sheltering Sky" (Discipline, 1981)
 "Discipline" (Discipline)

King Curtis
 "Soul Twist", (1962), No. 17 US, No. 1 R&B

Kiss

 "Love Theme from Kiss" (Kiss, 1974)

Kokomo
 "Asia Minor", (1961), No. 8 US, No. 35 UKAdopted from the Edvard Grieg, Piano Concerto in A minorand sub sequentially banned by the BBC.

L

Laika and the Cosmonauts
Most, if not all, of the band's recordings are instrumentals.

Led Zeppelin
 "Black Mountain Side" (Led Zeppelin, 1969)
 "Moby Dick" (Led Zeppelin II, 1969)
 "Bron-Yr-Aur" (Physical Graffiti, 1975)
 "Bonzo's Montreux" (Coda, 1982)
 "White Summer" (Led Zeppelin Boxed Set, 1990)
 "LA Drone" (How the West Was Won, 2003)
 "La La" (Deluxe Edition reissue of Led Zeppelin II, 2014)
 "10 Ribs & All/Carrot Pod Pod" (Deluxe Edition reissue of Presence, 2015)
 "St. Tristan's Sword" (Deluxe Edition reissue of Coda, 2015)

Link Wray
 "Rumble" (1958), No. 16 US, No. 11 R&B

Linkin Park
 "Session" (Meteora, 2003)
 "Wake" (Minutes to Midnight, 2007)
 "Tinfoil" (Living Things, 2010)
 "Drawbar" (The Hunting Party, 2014)

Liquid Tension Experiment
 Liquid Tension Experiment (1998)
 Liquid Tension Experiment 2 (1999)
 Liquid Tension Experiment 3 (2021)

Liquid Trio Experiment
 Spontaneous Combustion (2007)
 When the Keyboard Breaks: Live in Chicago (2009)

The Lively Ones
 Most, if not all, of the band's recordings are instrumentals in the surf music genre.

Lonnie Mack
 "Memphis", (1963), No. 5 US, No. 4 R&B

The Love Unlimited Orchestra
 "Love's Theme", (1973), No. 1 US, No. 10 UK, No. 10 R&B orchestra formed and song written by Barry White

M

Madness
 "The Return of the Los Palmas 7" (Absolutely, 1980)

Manfred Mann
 "Sack O' Woe" and "Mr. Anello" (‘’The Five Faces of Manfred Mann’’ 1964)
 Instrumental Asylum, EP, (1966)
 Instrumental Assassination, EP, (1966)

The Mar-Keys
 "Last Night", (1961), No. 3 US, No. 2 R&B

The Marketts
 "Out of Limits", (1963), No. 3 US

Mark Knopfler
 Local Hero (1983) except "The Way It Always Starts"
 Cal (1984)
 Comfort and Joy (1984)
 The Princess Bride (1987) except "Storybook Love"
 Last Exit to Brooklyn (1989) except "Tralala"
 Wag the Dog (1998) except "Wag the Dog"
 Altamira (2016)

Marty Friedman
 Dragon's Kiss (1988)	
 Scenes (1992)	
 Introduction (1994)	
 True Obsessions (1996)	
 Music For Speeding (2002)	
 Loudspeaker (2006)

Mastodon
 Jonah Hex: Revenge Gets Ugly EP, 2010

Mason Williams
 "Classical Gas" (The Mason Williams Phonograph Record, 1968), No. 2 US, No. 9 UK "orchestrated rock and roll" backed by the Wrecking Crew

Meshuggah
 "Acrid Placidity" (Destroy Erase Improve, 1995)

Metallica
 "(Anesthesia) – Pulling Teeth" (Kill 'Em All, 1983)
 "The Call of Ktulu" (Ride the Lightning, 1984)
 "Orion" (Master of Puppets, 1986)
 "To Live Is to Die" (...And Justice for All, 1988)
 "The Ecstasy of Gold" (S&M, 1999); (We All Love Ennio Morricone, 2007)
 "Suicide & Redemption" (Death Magnetic, 2008)

The Meters
 Most of the material released under their name is instrumental.
 The Meters (1969)
 Look-Ka Py Py (1969)
Struttin' (1970)
Cabbage Alley (1972)
Rejuvenation (1974)
Fire on the Bayou (1975)
Trick Bag (1976)
New Directions (1977)

MFSB
 "TSOP (The Sound of Philadelphia)", (1974), No. 1 US, No. 22 UK, No. 1 R&B

Michael Angelo Batio
 No Boundaries (1995)
 Planet Gemini (1997)
 Tradition (1999)
 Lucid Intervals and Moments of Clarity (2000)

Mike Watt
 "Maggot Brain" (Ball-Hog or Tugboat?, 1995)

Moby Grape
 The "Grape Jam" album of the Wow/Grape Jam two-album set is largely instrumental, featuring guest artists Mike Bloomfield and Al Kooper

Mogwai
Most, if not all, of Mogwai's recordings are instrumentals.

 "Summer"/"Ithica 27 ϕ 9" (1996)
 "New Paths to Helicon, Parts 1 and 2" (1997)
 "Superheroes of BMX" (4 Satin EP, 1997)
 "Like Herod" (Mogwai Young Team, 1997)
 "Mogwai Fear Satan" (Mogwai Young Team)
 "Christmas Steps" (Come on Die Young)

Mono
Most, if not all, of the band's recordings are instrumentals.

Muse

 "Popcorn" (B-side to "Resistance", 2009)

N

New Order
 "Elegia" (Low-Life, 1985)

Neil Young
 Soundtrack to Dead Man, 1996)

Nine Inch Nails

 "Just Like You Imagined" (The Fragile)
 Ghosts I–IV (2008)

O

Ozzy Osbourne
 "Dee" (Blizzard of Ozz, 1980)

Ozric Tentacles
Most of if not all of their albums consist of instrumentals.

The Offspring
 "In the Hall of the Mountain King" (Let the Bad Times Roll, 2021)

P

Particle
Most, if not all, of the band's recordings are instrumentals.

Paul Gilbert

 "Gilberto Concerto" (Flying Dog, 1998)
 "Whole Lotta Sonata" (Alligator Farm)
 "G.V.R.O." (Burning Organ, 2002)
 Get Out of My Yard (2006)
 Silence Followed by a Deafening Roar (2008)
 Fuzz Universe (2010)

Paul McCartney (and Wings)
 The Family Way (1967)
 "Singalong Junk" (McCartney)
 "Zoo Gang" (UK B-side of "Band on the Run", 1974)
 "Rockestra Theme" (Back to the Egg, 1979)
 Standing Stone (1997)
 Ocean's Kingdom (2011)

Pell Mell
Most, if not all, of the band's recordings are instrumentals.

Peter Gabriel
 Birdy (1985) (portions of the album are instrumental reworkings of previously recorded vocal tracks)
 Passion: Music for The Last Temptation of Christ (1989)
 Long Walk Home: Music from the Rabbit-Proof Fence (2002) (also contains elements from previously recorded vocal tracks)
 The first twelve tracks on Disc 2 of the deluxe edition of New Blood (2011) are instrumental versions of the first twelve tracks on the main album

Peter Frampton
 Fingerprints (2006)

Pink Floyd

 "Pow R. Toc H." (The Piper at the Gates of Dawn, 1967)
 "Interstellar Overdrive" (The Piper at the Gates of Dawn)
 "A Saucerful of Secrets" (A Saucerful of Secrets, 1968)
 "Up the Khyber" (Soundtrack from the Film More, 1969)
 "Party Sequence" (Soundtrack from the Film More)
 "Main Theme" (Soundtrack from the Film More)
 "More Blues" (Soundtrack from the Film More)
 "Quicksilver" (Soundtrack from the Film More)
 "A Spanish Piece" (Soundtrack from the Film More)
 "Dramatic Theme" (Soundtrack from the Film More)
 "Several Species of Small Furry Animals Gathered Together in a Cave and Grooving with a Pict" (Ummagumma)
 "The Grand Vizier's Garden Party (Parts I-III)" (Ummagumma)
 "Heart Beat, Pig Meat" (Zabriskie Point, 1970)
 "Come in Number 51, Your Time Is Up" (Zabriskie Point)
 "Atom Heart Mother" (Atom Heart Mother, 1970)
 "Alan's Psychedelic Breakfast" (Atom Heart Mother)
 "One of These Days" (Meddle, 1971)
 "Obscured by Clouds" (Obscured by Clouds, 1972)
 "When You're In" (Obscured by Clouds)
 "Mudmen" (Obscured by Clouds)
 "Absolutely Curtains" (Obscured by Clouds)
 "Speak to Me" (The Dark Side of the Moon, 1973)
 "On the Run" (The Dark Side of the Moon)
 "Any Colour You Like" (The Dark Side of the Moon)
 "Shine on You Crazy Diamond pts. I, II, III, V, VI, VIII, IX" (Wish You Were Here, 1975)
 "Signs of Life" (A Momentary Lapse of Reason, 1987)
 "Round and Around" (A Momentary Lapse of Reason)
 "Terminal Frost" (A Momentary Lapse of Reason)
 "Cluster One" (The Division Bell, 1994)
 "Marooned" (The Division Bell)
 "Unknown Song" (bonus track on Zabriskie Point reissue, 1997)
 "The Last Few Bricks" (Is There Anybody Out There? The Wall Live 1980–81, 2000)
 The Endless River (2014) except "Louder than Words"
 The Endless River (2014) (bonus tracks on Deluxe edition DVD/Blu-ray)

Pivot
Most, if not all, of the band's recordings are instrumentals.

The Police
 "Reggatta de Blanc" (Reggatta de Blanc, 1979)
 "Behind My Camel" (Zenyatta Mondatta, 1980)
 "The Other Way of Stopping" (Zenyatta Mondatta, 1980)

Porcupine Tree
 "Wedding Nails" (In Absentia, 2002)

Preston Epps
 "Bongo Rock" (1959), No. 14 US

The Pyramids
 "Penetration", (1964), No. 18 US, adopted from Edvard Grieg's Piano Concerto in A minor

Q

Queen

 "Seven Seas of Rhye" (Queen, 1973)
 "Procession" (Queen II, 1974)
 "God Save The Queen" (A Night At The Opera, 1975)
 A Dozen Red Roses For My Darling ("A Kind Of Magic" single B-side, 1986)
 "Forever" (A Kind Of Magic, 1986)
  "Chinese Torture" (The Miracle, 1989)
  "Track 13" (Made In Heaven, 1995)

Quiet Sun
 Mainstream, (1975)

R

Rainbow

 "Still I'm Sad" (Ritchie Blackmore's Rainbow, 1975)
 "Weiss Heim" ("All Night Long" single B-side, 1980)
 "Vielleicht Das Nächste Mal" (Difficult to Cure, 1981)

 "Difficult to Cure" (Difficult to Cure, 1981)
 "Anybody There" (Bent Out of Shape, 1983)
 "Snowman" (Bent Out of Shape, 1983)

Ray Anthony
 Peter Gunn (1959), No. 8 US, No. 22 UK, No. 4 R&B song's composer Henry Mancini wrote that it, "actually derives more from rock and roll than from jazz."

Ramones
 "Durango 95" (Too Tough to Die, 1984)

Reginald "Fieldy" Arvizu and various artists
 "A Song for Chi" (2009)

Red Hot Chili Peppers

 "Behind the Sun (Instrumental Demo)" (bonus track on The Uplift Mofo Party Plan reissue, 2003)
 "Me & My Friends (Instrumental Demo)" (bonus track on The Uplift Mofo Party Plan reissue)

Red Sparowes
Most, if not all, of the band's recordings are instrumentals.

Rhythm Heritage
 "Theme from S.W.A.T.", (1976), No. 1 US, No. 11 R&B

Rick Wakeman
 The Red Planet (2020)
 The Six Wives of Henry VIII (1973)

Rockin' Rebels, aka The Rebels
 "Wild Weekend", (1963), No. 8 US, No. 3 UK, No. 28 R&B

Rodrigo y Gabriela

 Re-Foc (2002)					
 Rodrigo y Gabriela (2006)
 11:11 (2009)
 Area 52 (2012)
 9 Dead Alive (2014)

The Rolling Stones

 "2120 South Michigan Avenue" (UK release Five by Five EP/US release 12 X 5, 1964)
 "Potted Shrimp" (studio outtake recorded in 1970)

Rod Stewart
 "I've Grown Accustomed to Her Face" (Smiler, 1974)

Roy Buchanan
 "Sweet Dreams" (Roy Buchanan, 1972)

Rush

 "2112 - I: Overture" (2112, 1976)
 "Cygnus X-1, Book I: Prologue" (A Farewell To Kings, 1977)
 "La Villa Strangiato" (Hemispheres, 1978)
 "YYZ" (Moving Pictures, 1981)
 "Broon's Bane" (Exit...Stage Left, 1981)
 "Leave That Thing Alone" (Counterparts, 1993)
 "Limbo" (Test for Echo, 1996)
 "Cygnus X-1" (Rush in Rio, 2003)
 "The Main Monkey Business" (Snakes & Arrows, 2007)
 "Hope" (Snakes & Arrows)
 "Malignant Narcissism" (Snakes & Arrows)

S

Sandy Nelson
Most, if not all, of Sandy Nelson's recordings are instrumentals.
 "Teen Beat" (1959), No. 4 US, No. 9 UK,  No. 17 R&B,  The piano on the recording is by Bruce Johnston.
 "Drums Are My Beat" (1962), No. 29 US, No. 30 UK

Santana

 "Soul Sacrifice" (Santana)
 "Incident at Neshabur" (Abraxas)
 "In a Silent Way" (Fillmore: The Last Days, 1972)
 "Europa (Earth's Cry Heaven's Smile)" (Amigos, 1976)
 "Jugando" (Festival, 1977)
 "Verão Vermelho" (Festival)
 "Revelations" (Festival)

Santo and Johnny
Most, if not all, of Santo & Johnny's recordings are instrumentals.
 "Sleep Walk" (Santo & Johnny, 1959), No. 1 US,  No. 22 UK, No. 4 R&B
 "Tear Drop", (1959), No. 23 US, No. 50 UK, No. 17 R&B

Savatage
 "Christmas Eve (Sarajevo 12/24)" (Dead Winter Dead)

Scorpions
 "Coast To Coast" (Lovedrive, 1979)

Sepultura
 "Inquisition Symphony" (Schizophrenia, 1987)
 "The Abyss" (Schizophrenia)
 "Kaiowas" (Chaos A.D., 1993)
 "Jasco" (Roots, 1996)
 "Itsári" (Roots, 1996)
 "Canyon Jam" (Roots, 1996)
 "Valtio" (Nation, 2001)
 "Enter Sandman/Fight Fire with Fire Medley" (Revolusongs, 2002)
 "Lost" (Dante XXI, 2006)
 "Limbo" (Dante XXI, 2006)
 "Eunoé" (Dante XXI, 2006)
 "Primium Mobile" (Dante XXI (2006)
 "Ludwig Van" (A-Lex, 2009)
 "Iceberg Dances" (Machine Messiah, 2017)
 "The Pentagram" (Quadra, 2020)
 "Quadra" (Quadra)

The Shadows

A significant number of the band's recordings are instrumentals.  See The Shadows discography for more details.
 "Apache" (1960)
 The Shadows EP (1961)
 "FBI"/"Midnight" (1961)
 "The Frightened City" (1961)
 "Kon-Tiki" (1961)
 "Wonderful Land" (1962)
 The Boys EP (1962)
 "Dance On!" (1962)
 "Foot Tapper" (1963)
 "Atlantis" (1963)
 "The Rise and Fall of Flingel Bunt" (1964)
 "The Warlord" (1965)
 "Maroc 7" (1967)

Silver Convention
 "Fly, Robin, Fly", (1975), No. 1 US, No. 28 UK, No. 1 R&B

Slade
 "M'Hat M'Coat" (Till Deaf Do Us Part, 1981)

Slayer
 "Delusions of Savior" (Repentless, 2015)

Slint
 Their untitled 1994 EP is composed entirely of instrumentals.

Sonic Youth
 SYR1: Anagrama EP (1997)
 SYR2: Slaapkamers Met Slagroom EP (1997)

Soulfly
 "Four Sticks" (bonus track on deluxe edition of Omen)

Steely Dan
 "East St. Louis Toodle-Oo", (Pretzel Logic, 1974), written by Duke Ellington

Steve Morse Band
Most, if not all, of the band's recordings are instrumentals.

Steve Stevens
 Atomic Playboys (1989)
 Flamenco a Go-Go (2000)
 Memory Crash (2008)

Stevie Ray Vaughan and Double Trouble
 "Rude Mood" (Texas Flood, 1983)
 "Testify" (Texas Flood)
 "Scuttle Buttin'" (Texas Flood)
 "Lenny" (Texas Flood)
 "Hide Away" (Couldn't Stand the Weather, 1984)
 "Say What!" (Soul to Soul, 1985)
 "Little Wing" (The Sky Is Crying, 1991)
 "Chitlins con Carne" (The Sky Is Crying)

The String-A-Longs
 "Wheels", (1961), No. 3 US, No. 8 UK, No. 19 R&B

Steve Vai

 "The Attitude Song" (Flex-Able)
 Passion and Warfare (1990)
 "Sofa" (Zappa's Universe, 1993)
 Alien Love Secrets EP (1995)
 "Fire Garden" (1996)
 The Ultra Zone (1999)
 Alive In An Ultra World (2001)
 Real Illusions: Reflections (2005)
 The Story of Light (2012)
 Modern Primitive (2016)

Styx
 "Little Fugue in G" (Styx II, 1973)

The Surfaris
 "Wipe Out"  b/w Surfer Joe No. 2 US

Symphony X
 "The Odyssey: Odysseus' Theme/Overture" (The Odyssey, 2002)

T

Tak Matsumoto
 "Little Wing" (live-only)

The T-Bones
 "No Matter What Shape (Your Stomach's In)", (1965), No. 3 US

Tangerine Dream
Only three albums in this band's extensive discography contain any vocal tracks: Cyclone (1978), Tyger (1987) and Inferno (2002).  Also, while the band's music does contain rock elements, it is often categorized within new-age, electronic and other genres instead.

Tarentel
Most, if not all, of the band's recordings are instrumentals.

Ted Nugent

 "Home Bound" (Cat Scratch Fever, 1977)

Timo Tolkki
 Classical Variations and Themes (1994)

The Tornados
Most of the band's recordings are instrumentals.
 "Telstar" (1962) No. 1 US, No. 1 UK, No. 5 R&B

Tony Levin
Most of Levin's solo recordings are instrumentals.  Notable exceptions are "L'Abito della Sposa" from Double Espresso (2002), most of Resonator (2006) and some of its followup, Stick Man (2007).

Tortoise

Most, if not all, Tortoise recordings are instrumentals.
 Tortoise (1994)
 Millions Now Living Will Never Die (1996)
 TNT (1998)
 Standards (2001)
 It's All Around You (2004)
 Beacons of Ancestorship (2009)

Traffic
 "Glad" (John Barleycorn Must Die, 1970)

Trans Am
 Trans Am, 1996
 Surrender to the Night, 1997
 Futureworld, 1999

Trans-Siberian Orchestra
 "Christmas Eve/Sarajevo 12/24" (Christmas Eve and Other Stories)
 "Wizards in Winter" (The Lost Christmas Eve)

U

U2 
 "4th Of July" (The Unforgettable Fire, 1984)
 "Boomerang 1" (The Unforgettable Fire, 1984)

V

Van Halen

 "Eruption" (Van Halen, 1978)
 "Spanish Fly" (Van Halen II, 1979)
 "Sunday Afternoon in the Park" (Fair Warning, 1981)
 "Cathedral" (Diver Down, 1982)
 "Little Guitars" (Diver Down, 1982)
 "1984" (1984, 1984)
 "316" (For Unlawful Carnal Knowledge, 1991)
 "Strung Out" (Balance, 1995)
 "Doin' Time" (Balance, 1995)
 "Baluchitherium" (Balance, 1995)
 "New World" (Van Halen III, 1998)
 "Primary" (Fair Warning, 1998)

Eddie and Alex Van Halen
 "Respect the Wind" (soundtrack to Twister, 1996)

Van McCoy
 "The Hustle", (1975), No. 1 US, No. 3 UK, No. 1 R&B

Van Morrison
 "Scandinavia" (Beautiful Vision, 1982)

The Ventures
Most, if not all, of the band's recordings are instrumentals.  See The Ventures discography for more details.

Vinnie Moore
Most, if not all, of Moore's recordings are instrumentals.

The Virtues
 "Guitar Boogie Shuffle", (1963), No. 5 US, No. 27 R&B

W

The Wailers aka The Fabulous Wailers
 "Tall Cool One", (1959), No. 36 US, No. 24 R&B

Walter Murphy
 "A Fifth of Beethoven", (1976), No. 1 US, No. 28 UK, No. 10 R&B, based on the first movement of Ludwig van Beethoven's Fifth Symphony

The Who
 "The Ox" (My Generation, 1965)
 "Cobwebs and Strange" (A Quick One, 1966)
 "Overture" (Tommy, 1969)
 "Sparks" (Tommy, 1969)
 "Underture" (Tommy, 1969)
 "Quadrophenia" (Quadrophenia, 1973)
 "The Rock" (Quadrophenia, 1973)
 "Hall of the Mountain King" (bonus track on The Who Sell Out reissue, 1995)
 "My Generation (Instrumental)" (bonus track on deluxe edition reissue of My Generation, 2002)

X

Y

The Yardbirds
 "Steeled Blues", (B-side of Heart Full of Soul, 1965)
 "Jeff's Boogie"  (B-side of "Over Under Sideways Down" 1966)
 "White Summer" (Little Games, 1967)

Yes

 "The Fish (Schindleria Praematurus)" (Fragile)
 "Five Per Cent For Nothing" (Fragile)
 "Cinema" (90125, 1983)
 "Amazing Grace" (9012Live: The Solos)

Yngwie Malmsteen

 Concerto Suite for Electric Guitar and Orchestra (1998)
 Angels of Love (2009)
 Spellbound (2012) except for "Repent", "Let Sleeping Dogs Lie", "Poisoned Minds"

Yowie
 Cryptooology (2004)

Z

See also
 Grammy Award for Best Rock Instrumental Performance
 Heavy metal music
 Instrumental rock
 List of instrumental bands
 Rock and roll
 Surf music

References

External links
 Every instrumental top 20 hit song from 1960 to the present from Tunecaster.com with a sample of each

Rock instrumentals
Rock instrumentals